Marius Ros (born 15 November 2001) is a French professional footballer who plays as a right-back for Ligue 2 side Pau.

Professional career 
Ros was born in Montpellier. He joined Montpellier as a youngster in 2019, having previously played for nearby Castelnau Le Crès. He graduated through the club's youth system and was released at the end of the 2021–22 season.

On 27 July 2022, Ros signed his first professional contract with Pau FC. Ros made his professional debut with Pau in a 0-0 Ligue 2 draw with Dijon FCO on 6 August 2022.

References

External links 

 
 Ligue 2 Profile

Living people
2001 births
French footballers
Ligue 2 players
Pau FC players
Montpellier HSC players
Association football defenders
Footballers from Montpellier